United States gubernatorial elections were held 6 November 1962 in 35 states, concurrent with the House and Senate elections.

In Minnesota, the governor was elected to a 4-year term for the first time, instead of a 2-year term. In North Dakota, this was the last election on a 2-year cycle, before switching to a 4-year term for governors.

The Democratic and Republican parties each gained seven governorships from the other party, leaving the overall partisan balance unchanged.

Results

See also
1962 United States elections
1962 United States Senate elections
1962 United States House of Representatives elections

References

 
November 1962 events in the United States